Arthur Moore may refer to:

 A. Harry Moore (Arthur Harry Moore, 1879–1952), American politician
 Arthur A. C. Moore (1880–1935), ice hockey player of the Silver Seven
 Arthur Claude Moore (1898–1978), Australian public servant and businessman
 Arthur Cotton Moore (born 1935), American architect
 Arthur Edward Moore (1876–1963), Premier of Queensland, 1929–1932
 Arthur Moore (Manitoba politician) (1882–1950), Canadian politician
 Arthur James Moore (1888–1974), Bishop of Methodist Church (Georgia, USA)
 Arthur John Moore (1849–1904), Member of Parliament for Clonmel and Londonderry City
 Arthur Moore (Tralee MP) (1765–1846), Member of Parliament for Tralee
 Arthur Moore (labor leader) (1933–2013), American labor leader
 Arthur Moore (racehorse trainer), Irish steeplechase trainer
 Arthur Moore (rugby league), English rugby league footballer of the 1910s and 1920s
 Arthur Thomas Moore (1830–1913), Irish Victoria Cross recipient
 Arthur William Moore (1853–1909), linguist, folklorist and politician on the Isle of Man
 Artie Moore (1887–1949), amateur wireless operator who received SOS signals from the Titanic
 Arthur Moore (Royal Navy officer) (1847–1934), British admiral
 Arthur Moore (Grimsby MP) (c. 1666–1730), Member of Parliament for Great Grimsby
 Arthur B. B. Moore (1906–2004), Canadian church moderator and university administrator
 Arthur Moore (priest) (1877–1954), Archdeacon of Norfolk
 J. Arthur Moore (1891–1979), lumberman, farmer and political figure in New Brunswick, Canada

See also
 Moore (surname)